Cristina M. Pumplun (1965) is the missionary vicar of the Westerkerk in Amsterdam. Until 2003 she was Secretary of Studies at the Thomas Institute in Utrecht.

Pumplun studied German language and literature in Amsterdam, at the Vrije Universiteit, and then in Passau, Germany. Her Ph.D. thesis investigated German devotional texts of the 17th century, specifically the work of Catharina Regina von Greiffenberg, and was published as Begriff des Unbegreiflichen: Funktion und Bedeutung der Metaphorik in den Geburtsbetrachtungen der Catharina Regina von Greiffenberg (1633-1694) (1995). She taught modern German literature and culture from 1995 to 2000 at Radboud University Nijmegen and the University of Amsterdam.

Bibliography

 (Festschrift for Ferdinand van Ingen)

References

Living people
1965 births
Academic staff of Radboud University Nijmegen
Academic staff of the University of Amsterdam
Vrije Universiteit Amsterdam alumni